Museum of Love is an American band formed by LCD Soundsystem drummer Pat Mahoney together with Dennis McNany. Their first song "Down South" was released in July 2013, followed by "Monotronic" in October 2013. Their first full-length album was released on October 14, 2014 by DFA Records. The duo released a new song "Marching Orders", their first in four years, in November 2018. They released another new song called "Cluttered World" in March 2021.

Their second studio album Life of Mammals is scheduled to be released in July 2021.

Discography
Patrick Mahoney and Dennis McNany aka Museum of Love of "Dross Glop 4" remix of "My Machines" by Battles feat Gary Numan (April 21, 2012) Warp Records
"Down South" digital release (July 2013) DFA Records
"Monotronic" digital release (October 2013) DFA Records
"Dingbat" (featuring Museum Of Love) Shit Robot DFA Records
Museum of Love LP (October 2014) DFA Records
Museum Of Love "The Remixes" digital only DFA Records
"Never Let It End" b/w Hardway Brothers Remix Limited Edition white label 12" DFA Records
"Monotronic" b/w "Who's Who Of Who Cares" (Baldelli & Dionigi Remix) DFA Records
Museum of Love remix of Zoé "Camara Lenta" (2015) Capitol Latin
Museum of Love remix of Mark E "Midnight Equatic" from "Sky Horn EP" (2016) Public Release
"What Follows" (featuring Museum of Love) Shit Robot / What Follows DFA Records

References

Musical groups established in 2013
American musical duos
2013 establishments in New York City